Perry Keyes (born 1966) is an Australian singer-songwriter.

Keyes is based in Waterloo, Sydney and grew up in nearby Redfern. Former singer-songwriter with Sydney band the Stolen Holdens, Keyes' output is best described as heartland rock in that the lyrics detail the minutiae of the seamier side of existence in and around the working class Sydney suburbs. Keyes has been acclaimed as "Redfern's answer to Bruce Springsteen".

Keyes is a supporter of his hometown rugby league club the South Sydney Rabbitohs.

Career
His debut album Meter was released in 2005. 
His second album The Last Ghost Train Home was named Radio National album of the year and was a finalist for the 2007 Australian Music Prize.

In the 2010s, Keyes released Johnny Ray's Downtown which was nominated for an ARIA Award at the ARIA Music Awards of 2010.

Sunnyholt was released in 2015. Jim Salmon's Lament was released 5 October 2018.

Discography

Albums

Awards and nominations

ARIA Music Awards
The ARIA Music Awards is an annual awards ceremony that recognises excellence, innovation, and achievement across all genres of Australian music. Sultan has been nominated for one award.

|-
| 2010
| Johnny Ray's Downtown
| ARIA Award for Best Adult Contemporary Album
| 
|-

Australian Music Prize
The Australian Music Prize (the AMP) is an annual award of $30,000 given to an Australian band or solo artist in recognition of the merit of an album released during the year of award. The commenced in 2005.

|-
| 2007
|Last Ghost Train Home
| Australian Music Prize
| 
|-

External links 
 Official Site

References

1966 births
Living people
Australian rock singers
Australian singer-songwriters
Musicians from Sydney
Australian male singer-songwriters